The 2006 KBS Drama Awards was a ceremony honoring the outstanding achievement in television on the Korean Broadcasting System (KBS) network for the year of 2006. It was held on December 31, 2006 and hosted by Tak Jae-hoon, Ryu Si-won and Choi Jung-won.

Nominations and winners

References

External links
http://www.kbs.co.kr/drama/2006award/

KBS Drama Awards
KBS Drama Awards
KBS Drama Awards
December 2006 events in South Korea